Sebastiano Satta (Nuoro, 21 May 1867 – Nuoro 29 November 1914) was an Italian poet, writer, lawyer and journalist.

He is considered the best-known Sardinian poet. Many streets in Italy are named after him, including the square where he used to live in Nuoro, where sculptures made by Costantino Nivola are located.

He graduated in law at the University of Sassari in 1894. After collaborating with the regional newspaper La Nuova Sardegna, he successfully worked in Nuoro as a lawyer.

During his life in Nuoro, he had close relationships with the other intellectuals living in the town, including Francesco Ciusa, Grazia Deledda, Antonio Ballero. Thanks to their notables works, Nuoro was starting to be referred as "Atene Sarda"  (Sardinian Athens).

References 

1867 births
1914 deaths
Italian male writers
University of Sassari alumni
19th-century Italian lawyers
Italian poets